John Leland Champe (1895–1978) was an academic and archaeologist especially influential in the area of Great Plains archaeology.

Champe was born in 1895 in Elwood, Nebraska. In 1921, he earned a BA from the University of Nebraska–Lincoln in mathematics. In 1924, he married Flavia Waters. Before moving to New York to enter the Ph.D. program in anthropology at Columbia University in 1938, Champe had been vice president and a claims adjustor at a Nebraska insurance company. While at Columbia, he studied under William Duncan Strong.

Champe then worked as a professional archaeologist for the Works Progress Administration until 1940 when he returned to the University of Nebraska–Lincoln as an instructor in mathematics. The next year he helped establish the Laboratory of Anthropology at the university.

He earned his Ph.D. from Columbia University in 1946 and became assistant professor of anthropology at the University of Nebraska–Lincoln in 1947. From 1953–1961, he was Chairman of the Department of Anthropology at the University of Nebraska–Lincoln.

References

1895 births
1978 deaths
University of Nebraska–Lincoln faculty
People from Gosper County, Nebraska
20th-century American archaeologists